Les Ripes railway station is a railway station in the municipality of Étagnières, in the Swiss canton of Vaud.

Services 
 the following services stop at Les Ripes:

References

External links 
 

Railway stations in the canton of Vaud
Lausanne–Echallens–Bercher Railway stations